The following lists events that happened during 1993 in Laos.

Incumbents
President: Nouhak Phoumsavanh 
Prime Minister: Khamtai Siphandon

Events
On 13 December 1993, a Lao Aviation Harbin Yunshuji Y-12-II (registration RDPL-34117) crashed on approach to Phonesavanh Airport after clipping trees in fog, killing all 18 on board.

Births
6 June - Tiny Bounmalay, footballer
18 December - Souliya Syphasay, footballer

References

 
Years of the 20th century in Laos
Laos
1990s in Laos
Laos